The Desperado is a 1954 American Western film directed by Thomas Carr and written by Daniel Mainwaring. It is based on the 1950 novel The Desperado by Clifton Adams. The film stars Wayne Morris, Jimmy Lydon, Beverly Garland, Rayford Barnes, Dabbs Greer and Lee Van Cleef. It was released on June 20, 1954 by Allied Artists Pictures.

Plot summary

Cast          
 Wayne Morris as Sam Garrett
 Jimmy Lydon as Tom Cameron 
 Beverly Garland as Laurie Bannerman
 Rayford Barnes as Ray Novak
 Dabbs Greer as Jim Langley
 Lee Van Cleef as Paul Clayton / Buck Clayton
 Nestor Paiva as Captain Jake Thornton
 Roy Barcroft as Martin Novack
 John Dierkes as Sergeant Rafferty
 Richard Shackleton as Pat Garner
 I. Stanford Jolley as Mr. Garner 
 Richard Garland as Trooper 
 Florence Lake as Mrs. Cameron

References

External links
 
 
 
 

1954 films
American Western (genre) films
1954 Western (genre) films
Allied Artists films
Films directed by Thomas Carr
Films scored by Raoul Kraushaar
American black-and-white films
1950s English-language films
1950s American films